Conasprella aphrodite is a species of sea snail, a marine gastropod mollusk in the family Conidae, the cone snails and their allies.

Like all species within the genus Conus, these snails are predatory and venomous. They are capable of "stinging" humans, therefore live ones should be handled carefully or not at all.

Description
Original description: "Shell thin, delicate, lightweight, glossy; outline straight sided, elongate, tapered toward the anterior end; shoulder smooth, sharp, slightly carinate; anterior one third with 6-8 faint spiral sulci; color lilac-purple with 3 bands of chestnut-brown flammules; base color pattern overlaid with 12 revolving rows of white and brown dots and dashes; one row of dashes just anterior of midbody line always more prominent than others; spire purple with alternating brown flammules; edge of shoulder with alternating brown and white dashes; aperture purple; periostracum thin, smooth, translucent yellow."

The size of the shell varies between 15 mm and 24 mm. Their shell shape and design may differ, but will always be a cone shape. Their shell colors will vary from a light brown with white flecks to all black.

When these snails feel threatened, they can shoot poison from their mouths that are in the shape of needles.

Distribution
Locus typicus: "Approximately 250 metres depth, off Panglao, 
Bohol Isl., Philippines."

This marine species occurs off the Philippines, New Caledonia 
and the Ryukyus, Japan.

References

 Tucker J.K. & Tenorio M.J. (2009) Systematic classification of Recent and fossil conoidean gastropods. Hackenheim: Conchbooks. 296 pp.
Conus (Gastropoda, Conidae) from offshore French Polynesia: Description of dredging from TARASOC expedition, with new records and new species. Xenophora Taxonomy 5: 26-49
  Puillandre N., Duda T.F., Meyer C., Olivera B.M. & Bouchet P. (2015). One, four or 100 genera? A new classification of the cone snails. Journal of Molluscan Studies. 81: 1–23

External links
 The Conus Biodiversity website
 Cone Shells – Knights of the Sea
 

aphrodite
Gastropods described in 1979